Sym-Bionic Titan is an American animated television series created by Genndy Tartakovsky (in his fourth collaboration with the channel), Bryan Andrews and Paul Rudish for Cartoon Network. The series focuses on a trio consisting of the alien princess Ilana, the strict but rebellious alien soldier Lance, and the robot Octus, who arrive on Earth and combine themselves to create the titular Sym-Bionic Titan.

A preview of the series was first shown at the 2009 San Diego Comic-Con International, and further details were revealed at Cartoon Network's 2010 upfront. The series premiered on September 17, 2010, and ended on April 9, 2011, with a total of 20 episodes as ordered by the channel; Tartakovsky had hoped to expand on that, but the series was not renewed for a second season, as it "did not have any toys connected to it".

While Sym-Bionic Titan has never been released to DVD in the United States, all 20 episodes were available for purchase on iTunes and the Microsoft Store. On October 7, 2012, reruns of the series began airing on Adult Swim's Toonami block along with the 2011 television series of ThunderCats until Cartoon Network wrote-off Sym-Bionic Titan for financial reasons in September 2014. The series was later released on Netflix in 2019, but was removed from the service in December 2020.

Premise
Billed as "an exciting hybrid of high school drama and giant robot battles", Sym-Bionic Titan features "the adventures of three beings from the planet Galaluna who crash-land on Earth while attempting to escape their war-torn world". The series follows the lives of Lance (voiced by Kevin Thoms), Ilana (voiced by Tara Strong) and Octus (voiced by Brian Posehn), two alien teenagers and a robot respectively in the form of humanoids living on Earth, an "identical" planet to Galaluna, while fleeing an evil general who has taken over their home planet with the help of monstrous creatures called Mutraddi. Ilana is the princess of the Galalunan royal family, Lance is a dark-hearted but capable soldier and Octus is a bio-cybernetic robot: all three having to now pose as normal high school students to blend into everyday life in Sherman, Illinois so Lance and Octus can conceal Ilana from General Modula (Don Leslie) and his hideous space mutants sent to kill the sole heir of Galaluna.

When called into battle, the Galalunans are outfitted with individual armor that provides more than ample protection. It is when the gravest of danger appears that Octus activates the sym-bionic defense program and he, Ilana, and Lance unite "Heart, Body and Mind" and come together to form the spectacular cyber-giant, Sym-Bionic Titan.

Production
Series co-creator Genndy Tartakovsky, best known for creating Dexter's Laboratory, Star Wars: Clone Wars and Samurai Jack for Cartoon Network, drew inspiration for the show from many sources. He grew up with various mecha anime series from the 1980s such as Robotech and Voltron: "For whatever reason, I have always loved the idea of kids driving giant robots". His biggest influence for the show were John Hughes films (such as Sixteen Candles and The Breakfast Club) and 1980s pop culture, while the relationship between the two teenage leads, Ilana and Lance, was inspired by that of Sheeta and Pazu, the two leads in Hayao Miyazaki's Castle in the Sky.

An episode of Samurai Jack with a similar plot, "Jack and the Flying Prince and Princess" (which had two aliens and a robot fleeing to seek help for their planet), may have also provided inspiration for the show. Tara Strong also voiced the princess in said episode.

Tartakovsky came up with Octus and the high-school setting first and later, together with co-creators Paul Rudish and Bryan Andrews, added Ilana and Lance as the protagonists. The creators of the show took a long time to develop the female lead: "A positive strong female character is something I've always wanted to create".

Tartakovsky had called Sym-Bionic Titan "the most challenging project I have ever done". Despite airing on Cartoon Network, Tartakovsky stated that he "doesn't consider Sym-Bionic Titan a kids show".

Cancellation and possible revival 
In March 2011, it was announced that Cartoon Network has cancelled Sym-Bionic Titan due to the show being unable to acquire a toy license. Adult Swim's Tumblr later revealed that both Beware the Batman and Sym-Bionic Titan were both written off by the network in September 2014.

In a 2018 interview with Syfy, Tartakovsky revealed that he and his crew had written 10 more episodes before the show was cancelled.

In February 2017, Tartakovsky mentioned that, during an interview about the revival of Samurai Jack on Adult Swim, he could also return to Cartoon Network someday and bring Sym-Bionic Titan back in order to end the story of season one and resolve its cliffhanger in the style of Guillermo del Toro's Pacific Rim. Ilana and Octus later made cameo appearances in the OK K.O.! Let's Be Heroes episode "Crossover Nexus", with Tara Strong reprising her role as Ilana. In the Craig of the Creek episode "Kelsey the Elder", this show was mentioned by Mark and Barry.

Episodes

Awards
Sym-Bionic Titan received two nominations at the 38th Annie Awards in 2011: Stephen DeStefano for Best Character Design in a Television Production; and Scott Wills for Best Production Design in an Animated Television Production.

Home media
The entire series was released on DVD in Australia from Madman Entertainment on April 6, 2016, five years after the show's cancellation. The show was made available for streaming on Netflix in December 2019, but was later removed from the service the following year. Although Sym-Bionic Titan has never been released to DVD or Blu-ray in the United States, all 20 episodes were also available on iTunes and the Microsoft Store in SD.

Reception 

The series was positively received. Emily Ashby of Common Sense Media said that the series had "action, adventure, and positive messages for tweens." She argued that while there is cartoon violence, the show has positive like Ilana, describing her a "role model-worthy main female character." She also noted that there is a "gentle side to the show" which makes it different from "many action-adventure cartoons for kids."

See also
 Megas XLR
 Pacific Rim
 3Below: Tales of Arcadia
 The Powers of Matthew Star

References

External links
 
 

2010 American television series debuts
2011 American television series endings
2010s American animated television series
2010s American comic science fiction television series
2010s American high school television series
American children's animated action television series
American children's animated adventure television series
American children's animated comic science fiction television series
American children's animated drama television series
American children's animated superhero television series
Animated television series about extraterrestrial life
Animated television series about robots
Anime-influenced Western animated television series
Cartoon Network original programming
Television series by Cartoon Network Studios
Cartoon Network Studios superheroes
English-language television shows
Fictional cyborgs
Mecha animation
Television series created by Genndy Tartakovsky
Television series created by Paul Rudish
Television series by Rough Draft Studios
Television shows set in Illinois
Teen animated television series
Teen superhero television series
Toonami